Diego Fernández Flores (born 7 October 2000) is a Chilean tennis player.

Fernández Flores has a career high ATP singles ranking of 783 achieved on 22 November 2021. He also has a career high ATP doubles ranking of 777 achieved on 20 December 2021.

Fernández Flores represents Chile at the Davis Cup, making his first appearance in a tie against Slovenia.

Davis Cup

Participations (1–0)

   indicates the outcome of the Davis Cup match followed by the score, date, place of event, the zonal classification and its phase, and the court surface.

References

External links

2000 births
Living people
Chilean male tennis players
21st-century Chilean people